Beatriz Gentil Pinheiro "Cissa" Guimarães (born April 18, 1957) is a Brazilian television presenter and actress.

Biography
Guimarães began her artistic career in 1977, when she participated in the play "Dor de Amor" (Pain of Love). In television, she became better known as a host of the variety show Rede Globo Vídeo Show, where she stayed for fifteen years (between 1986 and 2001).

In 1994, she posed nude for Playboy Magazine. In 2005, she posed nude again at age 48, this time in the magazine Sexy.

In 2010, she premiered in the play "Doidas e Santas." Since August 8, 2015, she is a presenter on the Saturday program "É de Casa".

Personal life
Guimarães was married for 15 years, with actor Paulo César Pereio. With him they had two sons Tomás and actor João. After the separation, she married saxophonist Raul Mascarenhas, with whom she lived for 4 years, and with him she had a son Rafael (1991-2010). Her third marriage lasted 6 years, with physician João Baptista Figueira de Mello, from whom she had no children. She did not remarry after the split, eventually appearing in the media with a boyfriend.

She studied chemistry at the Federal University of Rio de Janeiro.

On July 20, 2010, Guimarães lost her son, Rafael Mascarenhas, 18, who was run over in a tunnel in Gávea, south of Rio de Janeiro. The tunnel was closed for maintenance, but there was a passage through which two cars entered the tunnel and one of them ended up running over Rafael, who was skateboarding with his two friends.

Filmography

Television

As an actress

As a presenter

Film

Theater 
 2010 - Doidas e Santas

References

External links

1957 births
Living people
Actresses from Rio de Janeiro (city)
Brazilian film actresses
Brazilian telenovela actresses
Brazilian television actresses
Brazilian television presenters
Brazilian women television presenters